Dundee Law is a hill in the centre of Dundee, Scotland, and is the highest point in the city. The Law is what remains of a volcanic sill, which is the result of volcanic activity around 400 million years ago. With a large war memorial at its summit, it is the most prominent feature on the local skyline.

Geology
Dundee Law, which takes its name from a Scots word for a prominent hill, is an example of a volcanic sill. A volcanic area miles to the west forced lava through fissures in Old Red Sandstone. The subsequent action of rain, wind and ice eroded the sandstone, revealing the volcanic rock. Glaciers during the ice ages deposited more debris around the base, creating a crag and tail. The shallow gradient of the northern and eastern slopes of the law suggest a north-easterly movement of ice flows. Despite the derivation of "law" making it tautological to do so, the Law is commonly referred to as the "Law Hill".

History
Archaeological evidence of burials suggest that the Law may have been used by human settlers 3500 years ago. During the Iron Age it was the site of a Pictish settlement. Roman pottery has been found on the law, suggesting that the Romans may have used it as a lookout post in the first century. The Law played host to an important event on 13 April 1689: Viscount Dundee raised the Stuart Royal Standard on the Law, which marked the beginning of the first Jacobite rising.

The Law has a railway tunnel running through it, formerly used by the line to Newtyle which closed in the 1960s. In 2014, a campaign was started to reopen it as a tourist attraction.

A memorial to the fallen of both world wars, first unveiled on 16 May 1925, stands atop the summit of the Law. Between 1992 and 1994, the facilities on the summit were upgraded by Dundee District Council and Scottish Enterprise Tayside, with additional funding from the regional development fund of the European Commission. The memorial is lit with a large flame at its top on a number of significant days, viz: 25 September (in memory of the Battle of Loos, in which many members of the local Black Watch regiment lost their lives), 24 October (United Nations Day), 11 November (Armistice Day), and Remembrance Sunday.

In recent times Dundee Law featured prominently in the television drama Traces.

In 2022, as part of the Dundee Summer Streets Festival, a sign inspired by the Hollywood Hills sign was erected onto the Dundee Law which spelt out "Beanotown", a reference to the fictional location featured in The Beano that is published in Dundee and was the theme of the festival.

Gallery

References

Law
Volcanic plugs of Scotland
Mountains and hills of Angus, Scotland
Law
Tourist attractions in Dundee